The ASM-N-5 Gorgon V was an unpowered air-to-surface missile, developed by the Glenn L. Martin Company during the early 1950s for use by the United States Navy as a chemical weapon delivery vehicle. Developed from the earlier PTV-N-2 Gorgon IV test vehicle, the program was cancelled without any Gorgon Vs seeing service.

Design and development
The Gorgon V project was begun in 1950 to develop an air-to-surface missile capable of dispersing chemical warfare agents over a combat area. Designing of the missile was contracted to the Glenn L. Martin Company, which used the company's earlier PTV-N-2 Gorgon IV ramjet test missile as a basis for the weapon's design. The Gorgon V was to be a long slender missile, with swept wings and conventional tail. The Gorgon IV's ramjet engine, slung beneath the missile's tail, was replaced in the Gorgon V with a X14A aerosol generator, developed by the Edo Aircraft Corporation.

Operational use of the Gorgon V was intended to be based on two missiles being carried by a launching aircraft. The Gorgon V would be piloted by autopilot in a high-subsonic dive.

Development of the Gorgon V continued throughout the Korean War. In 1953 it was projected that the weapon would be ready for operational service by 1955. Later that year, the Gorgon V was cancelled by the US Navy. It is unknown if any prototypes were constructed before the termination of the project.

References

Notes

Citations

Bibliography

Cold War air-to-surface missiles of the United States
Chemical weapon delivery systems
Abandoned military rocket and missile projects of the United States
ASM-N-005